Carebara nana is a species of ant in the subfamily Formicinae, first described in 1863 by Julius Roger as Pheidologeton nanus. It is found in Sri Lanka.

References

External links

Myrmicinae
Hymenoptera of Asia
Insects described in 1863
Taxa named by Julius Roger